The Battle of Gloucester may refer to:

Siege of Gloucester, a siege in England in 1643 during the First English Civil War
Battle of Gloucester (1775), a land-sea engagement in the harbor of Gloucester, Massachusetts during the American Revolutionary War
Battle of Gloucester (1777), a minor engagement in Gloucester, New Jersey during the American Revolutionary War
Siege of Yorktown, which included a minor engagement near Gloucester Point, Virginia late in the American Revolutionary War
Battle of Gloucester Point (1861), a minor engagement between a Union gunboat and a Virginia (Confederate) shore battery at the beginning of the American Civil War
Battle of Cape Gloucester, fought in and around Cape Gloucester on the New Guinean island of New Britain in the Pacific theater of the Second World War